Darby Ross is a former Australian international lawn bowler.

Bowls career
Ross was selected as part of the five man team by Australia for the 1988 World Outdoor Bowls Championship, which was held in Auckland, New Zealand.

He won a triples gold medal (with Ken Williams and Trevor Morris) and a fours bronze medal, at the 1987 Asia Pacific Bowls Championships, held in Lae, Papua New Guinea.

In 1981, he won the Hong Kong International Bowls Classic pairs title.

References

Australian male bowls players
Living people
Year of birth missing (living people)